Ankita Bhandari was a receptionist at Vanantra Resort in Ganga-Bhogpur in Pauri District, Uttarakhand, who was allegedly murdered by Pulkit Arya, the son of the BJP leader Vinod Arya and owner of the Vanantra Resort, on 18 September 2022. He was allegedly helped by Saurabh Bhaskar and Ankit Gupta.

Background 
Ankita Bhandari hailed from Dobh-Srikot, Pauri Garhwal, Uttarakhand. After completing intermediate, she did a 6 
months diploma in Hotel Management from Dehradun. After that, Ankita started working as a receptionist at Vanantra Resort, Rishikesh, Uttrakhand, on 28 August 2022. She also had a relationship with Pushap Deep Kumar of Jammu, whom she met online.

Murder 
On 18 September, Ankita did not respond to her parents' calls and when the family tried to locate her in her room they were unable to find her. She also did not return calls of Pushap Deep, who became suspicious as Ankita had told him about harassment at the resort. She was being pressured to provide "extra service" to a VIP for Rs. 10000. Her father registered a missing complaint in the Revenue police area. However, for 2 days no action could be taken.

Later the case was transferred to the Laxman Jhula police, who managed to arrest the three accused in the case- Pulkit Arya (the key accused), the hotel's manager, Ankit Gupta, and Pulkit's friend, Saurabh Bhaskar. During the police interrogation, the three confessed their crime and said that after Pulkit had a heated conversation with Ankita, they all went to a nearby location to resolve the things, however, on their way, they had an altercation with Ankita after which they pushed her into the Chilla canal. They then returned to the hotel and told a different story to their staff.

Ankita's dead body was recovered by the State Disaster Response Force of the Uttarakhand police on 24 September 2022. The body was recovered from the Chilla canal's barrage. Her preliminary autopsy was done by the All India Institute of Medical Sciences Rishikesh and it stated that Ankita sustained certain injuries suggestive of blunt force trauma before her death. As per the report, the cause of her death was drowning.

Investigation and aftermath 
The resort was bulldozed and torched the same night by unknown persons and sustained heavy damage. Initially, it was cited as quick justice by the government, but later the DM denied govt involvement in the matter.

Ankita's family was not satisfied with the postmortem report and said that they will not perform her last rites until the final autopsy report was released by the police in the public. They also accused the administration of destroying evidence by bulldozing the resort.

However, after several appeals from the local administration and the Chief Minister of Uttrakhand Pushkar Singh Dhami, Ankita's family agreed to perform her last rites. Calling the incident 'unfortunate' Dhami assured the family that the trial would be held in a fast-track court and the strictest punishment will be given to the accused.

On 25 September 2022, Ankita's last rites were performed by her family members at the NIT Ghat of Srinagar. There was the presence of a large number of people at the funeral ground. Many leading politicians from the state including Tirath Singh Rawat, a sitting Member of Parliament and former Chief Minister of Uttarakhand, and Rajendra Bhandari, Congress MLA from Badrinath mourned her death and extended a helping hand to her family.

An SIT was formed by the police to investigate the case. However, groups of locals on social media and the father of the victim moved High Court to ensure probe by CBI. In December 2022, the police filed a 500 page chargesheet against the three accused.

See also
 Murder of Shraddha Walkar

References 

Crime in Uttarakhand
2022 murders in India